Narok County is a county in Kenya with an estimated population of 1,157,873 according to 2019 Census. The dominant ethnic group is the Maasai. Its capital and largest town is Narok, with the only other major urban centre being Kilgoris. Narok County Government was formed by the County Governments Act of 2012 as prescribed in the 2010 Constitution of Kenya. Narok County governor is Patrick Ole Ntutu after winning in the 2022 elections and his Deputy is Tamalinye K. Koech.

Along with Kisii County, Narok County has been identified as having the highest level of practice of female genital mutilation in the country, despite the practice being outlawed in 2001.

Geography
Narok County is situated in the southern part of the Great Rift Valley. It lies between latitudes 0° 50' and 1° 50' South and longitude 35° 28' and 36° 25' East. The county borders the Republic of Tanzania and six other counties – Nakuru, Bomet, Nyamira, Kisii, Migori County and Kajiado.

The Maasai Mara National Reserve and Mau Forest are located in the county.

Economy
The main economic activities in the county include pastoralism, crop farming, tourism and trade among other activities undertaken in small scale.

County subdivisions
The county has six constituencies: 
Narok North Constituency
Narok South Constituency
Narok East Constituency
Narok West Constituency
Emurua Dikirr Constituency
Kilgoris Constituency

Narok County wards
There are thirty Members of County Assembly (MCAs) representing the thirty wards at Narok County Assembly. These wards were formed in 2010 by the Boundaries Review Commission. There are six wards in Narok North Constituency, Narok South Constituency and Kilgoris Constituency respectively.

Narok West Constituency, Emurua Dikirr Constituency and Narok East Constituency each have four county wards

Communities

Population

Notable people
 Kurito ole Kisio, Mau Mau general
 Daniel Rudisha, Olympic world record middle-distance runner
 David Rudisha, son of Daniel, also an Olympic world record runner
 Sianto Sikawa, communications and marketing professional, Assistant Director of Tourism and Wildlife in Narok County

References

 
Counties of Kenya